is a fictional character in the Samurai Shodown (Samurai Spirits in Japan) series of fighting games by SNK. She is one of the series' best known and most popular characters alongside its main protagonist Haohmaru, and has been introduced in the original Samurai Shodown in 1993. Nakoruru is a good-hearted, young Ainu shrine maiden who loves nature and fights evil with the help of her hawk sidekick Mamahaha. She has a younger sister named Rimururu and an aggressive, and bloodthirsty darker side alter-ego known as Rera. As one of SNK's popular mascot characters, Nakoruru has also appeared in many other games and other media.

Appearances

Samurai Shodown games
Nakoruru is featured as a player character in most game entries in the Samurai Shodown series, including Samurai Shodown (1993), Shinsetsu Samurai Spirits Bushidō Retsuden (a role-playing game), Samurai Shodown II, Samurai Shodown III (where she also makes background appearance in Rimururu's stage), Samurai Shodown IV, Samurai Shodown V, Samurai Shodown V Special, Samurai Shodown VI, Samurai Shodown!, Samurai Shodown 64, Samurai Shodown! 2, Samurai Shodown 64: Warriors Rage, Samurai Shodown: Edge of Destiny, and Samurai Shodown (2019). She is also playable in various mobile spin-off titles, such as endless runner Samurai Shodown Slash, action game Samurai: Rougetsuki Densetsu, and rising simulation Maid by Iroha.

In Samurai Shodown: Warriors Rage, the spirit of Nakoruru is an unplayable story mode character, but its PocketStation mini game is centered around her. She also featured as a non-player character mentor to the protagonist in the spin-off game, Nakoruru: Ano Hito kara no Okurimono, a 2001 visual novel adventure game which takes place between the first two games in the series.

In the series, Nakoruru is a gentle and shy teenage girl serving Mother Nature as a shamanic priestess of the Ainu religion, born on Hokkaido island in 1771. Despite her usually pacifistic ways, she became a Kamui warrior of her peaceful village Kamuikotan (神居古潭) after the death of her idolized father, and continues to fulfill this role throughout the series, fighting evil, often alongside Haohmaru, and even assuming a human form after her death (when she sacrifices herself to restore the balance of nature and preserve the land for her people at the end of the second game). Eventually, she merges her soul with Gaia and becomes "the holy spirit who wanders through time" in a form that resembles a koro-pok-guru. Unable to assume her original form, she asks the player to awaken her younger sibling, Rimururu the Maiden of Light, who has been sealed by Oboro.

Nakoruru fights with a treasured ceremonial makiri (a type of Ainu dagger or short sword sometimes known as "Ainu kodachi") called the Chichi-ushi (チチウシ, Father Bull). Depending on the form, she is aided by either a mountain hawk-eagle named Mamahaha (ママハハ, in her "Slash" form) or a cross between  Hokkaido wolf and Siberian wolf named Shikuru (シクルゥ, in her "Bust" form), also having other animal friends. Her powers include communicating with nature, fueling her blade with ki energy, ability to reflect a projectile back to its sender using her cloak, and healing wounds with the power of nature. American ninja Galford D. Weller is in love with her. The endings for Samurai Shodown VI revealed that Nakoruru and an alter-ego of Galford traveled the world together.

The King of Fighters games
In The King of Fighters series, Nakoruru has first appeared playable as a secret character in the Game Boy version of The King of Fighters '95 (without her animals). She also appeared as a non-playable character in The King of Fighters '94 Re-Bout, The King of Fighters 2000 (as a Special Striker for Yuri Sakazaki), The King of Fighters 2002: Unlimited Match, and The King of Fighters XIII (in the Japan stage and in the Android/iOS versions as a tutorial instructor).

Nakoruru has made her canonical playable debut in The King of Fighters XIV, as the leader of the "Another World Team", playing a vital role in that new arc. In it, Nakoruru senses recent timeline changes (caused by Ash Crimson at the end of the thirteenth tournament) as a new terrible evil known as Verse is coming through a rift in time and space. To prevent that, Nakoruru travels to the present and teamed up with Dragon Gals Mui Mui and Sky Love's Love Heart to enter the tournament and defeat Verse. Together with Team Japan and Team Official Invitation, Nakoruru and her team manage to beat Verse, and afterwards they have fun visiting Hokkaido and China. Nakoruru and her teammates has been revealed was requested, recruited, and helped by the time traveling expert, Dr. Brown Sugar (the unplayable character from World Heroes series). Nakoruru returns as a playable character in SNK All-Star, in which she and four characters from Samurai Shodown (Haohmaru and Ukyo Tachibana) and The Last Blade (Kaede and Yuki) awaken in the modern world and must team up with Kyo Kusanagi in a fight to seal away the KOF series' antagonist Orochi.

Other video games
Besides Samurai Shodown and The King of Fighters games, Nakoruru is playable in the fighting games Capcom vs. SNK: Millennium Fight 2000 (as an unlockable secret character), Capcom vs. SNK 2, SNK vs. Capcom: The Match of the Millennium (as rival of Capcom's Morrigan Aensland), Neo Geo Battle Coliseum, SNK Gals' Fighters, and SNK Heroines: Tag Team Frenzy. She is also playable in various SNK games such as Neo Geo Tennis Coliseum, Quiz King of Fighters, and The Rhythm of Fighters.

Nakoruru has also made collaboration event appearances in many portable and mobile games, including Afk Arena,Dai Shingeki RPG! Sister Quest, Dark Avenger X, Granblue Fantasy,  The King of Fighters All Star, Kingdom Story: Brave Legion, Kal Kal Kal All Together, Kotatsu Mikuni Kansai Senki, Might & Magic: Elemental Guardians, The Samurai Kingdom, Honor of Kings (Wangzhe Rongyao), Yamato Chronicle, and You Are the Hero!. In Blade Smash she was redesigned as a ninja, while in Lost Saga she was made optionally male as well female.

Nakoruru is furthermore a non-player character in the dating sims Days of Memories: Oedo Love Scroll and Kaze Maiu Miyako de Tsukamaete!, and has a cameo of Rera as Nakoruru in Sekai de Ichiban Atsui Fuyu. She appears in cards in SNK Dream Battle and SNK vs. Capcom Card Fighters DS. She also appears as a spirit in Nintendo's Super Smash Bros. Ultimate, where a Mii Fighter costume based on her is available as downloadable content.

 Other appearances 
Nakoruru appears in an anime film Samurai Shodown: The Motion Picture and in an anime OVA miniseries Nakoruru: Ano Hito kara no Okurimono (as titular lead character) and Samurai Spirits 2: Asura-Zanmaden (appearing along with Rera in both OVAs), also making a cameo in Fatal Fury: The Motion Picture (in a cosplay of Reiko Chiba), as well as in a number of manga releases (including as a co-protagonist of Kyoichi Nanatsuki and Yuki Miyoshi's adaptation of the first Samurai Shodown, which was serialized in the West in an American magazine Game On!). She is also featured in several of the series' drama CDs and is a member in SNK's character image band, Band of Fighters, starring in her own character image CD.

Nakoruru further shows up in pachinko slot machine systems, including prominently in "Samurai Spirits" and especially "Samurai Spirits Oni (Nakoruru)". She has dozens of figurines made in her image, and even a life-size figure, also being featured in various other merchandise such as T-shirts, and in an American collectible card game Universal Fighting System. Keeping in key with her nature-loving persona, Nakoruru was used as a mascot for SNK's environmental awareness campaigns conducted together with city administrations in Mitaka and Kyoto in 1994. In 2007, SNK Playmore also created a social action program for children using Nakoruru and the Fatal Fury star Terry Bogard as their mascots. An image of praying Nakoruru was used to support the 2011 Tōhoku earthquake and tsunami relief fund-raising. 

Design and gameplay
The series' creator Yasushi Adachi chose "the two flagship characters" Haohmaru and Nakoruru as the characters that best sum up the series, with Nakoruru being "a main character in the storyline who has to fight for her life and her destiny, and sacrifices herself in the end to preserve an important cause," and thus representing "some of the most important Samurai Shodown themes." The idea for the character came from a modern Japanese perception of the indigenous Ainu people of Hokkaido, being depicted as revering nature and peacefully coexisting with it. Before the Samurai Spirit project began, one of Nakoruru's creators had thought that "one day Ainu women should have a first-class appearance" in a video game as he thought they have had received too little attention and representation in modern media.

Her costume design was based on Ainu clothing (in two main versions depending on the length of her skirt) and she was supposed to mix a concept of a "petite girl with a lovely appearance and personality" with an "innovative" character performance of commanding a hawk companion in battle. Although Nakoruru was not directly modeled after any particular existing character, Hilda from The Great Adventure of Horus, Prince of the Sun and Kamui from The Dagger of Kamui helped her conception process. The girl that appears during Nakoruru's entrances in Capcom vs. SNK is one of her childhood friends introduced in Nakoruru: Ano Hito kara no Okurimono, Manari. Nakoruru was notably the first fighting game character brought back to life following her demise and one of the first who used a sidekick character in gameplay.

Nakoruru is a rather petite girl that is 153 cm tall. An alternate, palette swap version of her with tanned skin, different colors of hair and eyes, and a bigger chest is the Bust Nakoruru (羅刹ナコルル, Rasetsu Nakoruru) or EX Nakoruru,''' a recurring "Easter egg" type character that eventually evolved into Rera. In the 1999 anime film Samurai Spirits 2: Asura Zanmaden, Rera tries to support her host in giving up fighting for a while, but eventually she understands Nakoruru in what has to be done to help Shiki. Nakoruru leaves to help Shiki, but not before Rera warns her that if she doesn't succeed, she will kill her host. Rera later appears at the end of the film telling Nakoruru to be safe on her journey. In the fan service oriented fighting game SNK Heroines: Tag Team Frenzy, Nakoruru appears as default in a "sexy vampire" costume with a bat as her animal, while in The King of Fighters XIV she can be dressed up in a modern schoolgirl uniform of the "Kamuikotan Private High School".

To compensate for Nakoruru's short weapon range, players must rely on her speed to punish their opponents' mistakes. Nakoruru's strengths lie in her air supremacy (including aerial throws) and ability to jump around the sides of the screen. She can also recover from her moves a little quicker than other characters, making it easier for her to hit-and-run during fights. To balance her out with the rest of the cast, her attack strength is slightly weaker than most fighters. Her move set usually incorporates slightly longer ranged attacks that project her or her animal companions to her foes so her attack range is not limited to her sword. Since Samurai Shodown II, she can also reflect projectiles with the move "Kamui Ryusei". Mamahaha can be used by the player to attack opponents in a diagonal aerial attack, acting as Nakoruru's projectile and anti-air defense. The player may also command Nakoruru to use him as a mount for a limited time. Whilst she is in the air, players can command the pair to hover higher, drop, or use Nakoruru to attack foes; she may do so normally from Mamahaha's height or players may choose to drop her in a swirl attacking motion or use a diagonal nosedive attack. Her moves' names are written in Hokkaido Ainu.

Prior to Samurai Shodown V Special, Nakoruru and Rimururu have been the series' two characters notable for being immune to the Fatality-like bloody killing moves. In Samurai Shodown: Edge of Destiny, Mamahaha does not appear in fights except in special moves. The presence of monkeys in Nakoruru's stage in the original Samurai Shodown was a mistake of the background designer Tomoaki Fukui which confused many fans as there are no monkeys on Hokkaido. There have been attempts to add Nakoruru into the series The King of Fighters already during the 1990s: a "Samurai Spirits Team" was originally scheduled to participate in The King of Fighters '95 and The King of Fighters '96 as Nakoruru was intended to team up with Galford and Haohmaru.

Rera

 (meaning "Wind" in Ainu) is a player character introduced in 2003. Her mannerism was based on Nakoruru's "Bust" form, being a violent and haughty ego of hers. The ruthless Nakoruru suppresses this side of herself as Rera sees "eliminating everyone who stands in her way" as a necessity to protect nature. Rera can physically take over Nakoruru, but has only done so when Nakoruru is reluctant to kill her enemies, and even manifest as a separate material entity to protect her host. Rera eventually merges back with Nakoruru after she realizes that fighting does not solve everything and peaceful solutions can be made.

Rera is playable in Samurai Shodown V and VI. Similar to Nakoruru's "Bust" form in Samurai Shodown III and IV, she too wields a short sword and fights alongside her wolf, Shikuru, which primarily serves as a mount for her mount and is a necessity for several her special moves. Whilst Rera mounts him, the player can run faster and jump longer distances at the sacrifice of a lower height. She also appears in Days of Memories and in the film Nakoruru: Ano Hito kara no Okurimono.

In the games, Rera wears an outfit similar to her host, but the coloring is indigo and white instead of the usual white and red outfit Nakoruru wears. Her pants are also different, being indigo with a black stripe at the end. She wears indigo shoes similar to Nakoruru's red ones, but with a brown stripe on the rims, and a necklace with a red gem on it. In her film appearance, Rera wears an outfit similar to Nakoruru's but its outlines are purple instead of read. She also has a purple lacey on top of her head, but does not have a ribbon on the back of her hair.

Reception and cultural impact
As an iconic Samurai Shodown and SNK character, Nakoruru has been well received worldwide, becoming especially popular in Japan. According to The King of Fighters XIV producer Yasuyuki Oda, this surprised even the company as no one at SNK had "expected that Nakoruru would become a popular character to that extent." Her great popularity has made many in Japan interested in the modern Ainu people.

Japanese arcade gaming magazine Gamest named her as the best character of 1993, later also placing her sixth in 1995 and 1996, 13th in 1997, and tenth in 1998. Japanese Sega Saturn Magazine ranked her as the eight best female character on the Sega Saturn in 1997, with her sister Rimururu placing 31st. Japanese magazine Neo Geo Freak ranked her as the fifth best character on the Neo Geo in 1998, where Rimururu was eight; Nakoruru and Rimururu have been also voted as respectively first and third most popular female characters by the male readers of Neo Geo Freak in 1997. Retrospectively, Japanese magazine Famitsu declared Nakoruru as overally the 37th top video game heroine of the 1990s, with her being one of the only three non-Capcom fighting game characters on this list. Nakoruru was added to 2016's KOF XIV due to her enduring popularity. In a 2018 Famitsu poll for the most popular Neo Geo character, Nakoruru was voted third in general and first among the female ones (noted as ahead of the likes of Mai Shiranui or Athena Asamiya).

Authors of the many (often erotic) Nakoruru-themed dōjin manga include Aoi Nanase, whose original take on a resurrected Nakoruru was praised by many as arguably better than official illustrations and was even later used for the creation of the series' anime adaptation. Similar to Capcom's Chun-Li, Nakoruru became particularly popular among cosplaying girls in Japan, as well as even some males, especially at Tokyo Game Show events during the 1990s. A cosplayer dressed as her is featured in Honobu Yonezawa's novel Hyōka and in its anime adaptation.

In the West, GamePro reviewers criticized the original Samurai Shodown for its perceived unbalancing of characters, singling out Nakoruru as "too weak", but Electronic Gaming Monthly conversely opined that "despite her size, Nakoruru is one of the deadlier fighters" in the game. Hobby Consolas described this "no doubt" favourite Samurai Shodown female character as an equivalent of Mai Shiranui from Fatal Fury but with a different appeal, that is an irresistible cuteness instead of sexual provocativeness. She has since been included among the series' favourites of many gaming publications, including Anime News Network, GamesRadar, IGN, Joystiq, Official Xbox Magazine and VideoGamer.com. In 2012, GamesRadar listed Nakoruru among top seven fighting game characters of all time, comparing her to a "feudal Japan version of Captain Planet".

The staff of Retro Gamer chose when they had first saw Nakoruru as their "defining moment" of Samurai Shodown, due to her "incredibly useful" hawk companion Mamahaha as "a very early use of a satellite character, an innovative concept in fighting games." Tracey John from MTV also included Mamahaha (misspelled as "Mahaha") among the greatest birds in video game history and Rich Knight from Complex listed it as one of the ten craziest weapons in fighting games. 

References

External links
Nakoruru and Rera at Samurai Shodown'' official website

Female characters in anime and manga
Female characters in video games
Fictional Ainu people
Fictional characters from Hokkaido
Fictional characters with dissociative identity disorder
Fictional miko
Fictional Japanese people in video games
Fictional kenjutsuka
Fictional shamans
Religious worker characters in video games
Samurai Shodown characters
Teenage characters in video games
SNK protagonists
The King of Fighters characters
Video game characters introduced in 1993
Video game mascots
Woman soldier and warrior characters in video games